John Alexander Hastie Inglis Stalker (born 12 March 1959) is a Scottish former footballer who played as a forward. He began his senior career in England with Leicester City, but moved on to Darlington, for whom he scored 36 goals from 116 appearances in the Football League. After a short spell with Hartlepool United, Stalker returned to his native Scotland, where he played in the Scottish League for Meadowbank Thistle and East Fife before moving into junior football with Penicuik Athletic and Newtongrange Star.

References

1959 births
Living people
Sportspeople from Musselburgh
English footballers
Association football forwards
Leicester City F.C. players
Darlington F.C. players
Hartlepool United F.C. players
Livingston F.C. players
East Fife F.C. players
Penicuik Athletic F.C. players
Newtongrange Star F.C. players
English Football League players
Scottish Football League players
Scottish Junior Football Association players
Footballers from East Lothian